Qaleh Joq-e Bozorg (also Romanized as Qal‘eh Joq-e Bozorg and Qal‘eh Jaq-e Bozorg; also known as Qal‘eh Jūq-e Bozorg and Qal‘eh Joq-e Jadīd) is a village in Garmkhan Rural District, Garmkhan District, Bojnord County, North Khorasan Province, Iran. At the 2006 census, its population was 54, in 12 families.

References 

Populated places in Bojnord County